Sound of Gospel Records was founded in Detroit, Michigan, United States in 1969 by Armen Boladian. It is a gospel subsidiary record label of Westbound Records, where Boladian was also its former president.

Sound of Gospel signed up well-known gospel music acts including Mattie Moss Clark, The Clark Sisters, Voices of Tabernacle, Jerry Q. Parries, Yolanda Adams, Thomas Whitfield, and Rev. James Moore. The label also signed Esther Smith and the Youth IV Christ Fellowship Mass Choir. Pastor and church organist, the late Rev. Charles Nicks, Jr., and the St. James Adult Choir also signed up with the label, and released albums like Hold Back the Night.

Artist roster (past and present) 
This is a list of artists, past and present, who have recorded albums for Sound of Gospel Records over the past few decades.

The voices of tabernacle 
 The Clark Sisters (1976-1982)
 The New Jerusalem Baptist Church Mass Choir
 Esther Smith
 Rev. Charles Nicks, Jr. & The St. James Adult Choir
 Kenneth Ward & The Southwest Mass Choir
 Galilee Mass Choir
 Ruth Busbee
 Thomas Whitfield
 Rev. Charles O. Miles
 The B.L.& S. Singers
 Andre Woods & Chosen
 Michael Johnson
 Rev. Donald Vails & the Choraleers
 The Bright Star Male Chorus
 Yolanda Adams
 Jerome L. Ferrell
 Greater Cleveland Choral Chapter
 Rev. Dr. George A. Copeland & The United Faith Church of Deliverance Mass Choir
 Mattie Moss Clark
 International Gospel Center's Voices of Deliverance
 Joy
 Wolverine State Baptist Mass Choir
 Rev. James Moore
 Wanda Nero Butler
 Thomas Butler
 Youth IV Christ Fellowship Mass Choir
 Jerry Q. Parries & The Christian Family Choir
 Herman Harris & Voices of Faith, Hope & Love
 Texas Mass Choir of the GMWA
 Voices of Heaven
 D.K. Craig & Voices of Tabernacle
 Harold Sutton
 B. J. Fears & the L.I.F.E. Choir
 Anthony Whigham
 John W. Griggs
 Atlanta Philharmonic Chorale
 Timothy Wright
 Lighthouse Inter-Denominational Choir
 F.A.M.E. Freedom Choir
 Charles G. Hayes
 Cosmopolitan Church of Prayer Choir
 James Cleveland
 Arvis Strickling-Jones
 Michigan State Community Choir
 Anthony Whigham
 Rev. Walter Richardson
 Vincent Manyweather
 Helen Stephens
 The Northern California Chapter of GMWA
 Youth IV Christ Fellowship Mass Choir
 Salvation Corporation
 Oscar Hayes
 Darius Brooks

Hit songs 
"You Brought The Sunshine", by the Clark Sisters, became a national hit.

External links
 Detroit Gospel website

American record labels
Christian record labels
Record labels established in 1969
Companies based in Detroit